Grupo Universitario is an Argentine football club from the city of Tandil, Buenos Aires Province. The team currently plays in the torneo Argentino B, the regionalised 4th level of the Argentine football league system

See also
List of football clubs in Argentina
Argentine football league system

External links
Deporte Tandilense website 

 
Association football clubs established in 1984
1984 establishments in Argentina